German submarine U-64 was a Type IXB U-boat of Nazi Germany's Kriegsmarine during World War II. She was ordered by them in July 1937. Her keel was laid down by AG Weser in Bremen in December 1938. Following about nine months of construction, she was launched in September 1939 and formally commissioned  into the Kriegsmarine in December.

U-64 had a very short career and sank no enemy vessels. Of her crew of 46, eight men died and 38 escaped from the sinking submarine.

Construction and design

Construction
U-64 was ordered by the Kriegsmarine on 16 July 1937 as part of Plan Z and in violation of the Treaty of Versailles. Her keel was laid down on 15 December 1938 by AG Weser in Bremen as yard number 952. She was launched on 20 September 1939 and commissioned on 16 December under the command of Kapitänleutnant Georg-Wilhelm Schulz.

Design
German Type IXB submarines were slightly larger than the original German Type IX submarines, later designated IXA. U-64 had a displacement of  when at the surface and  while submerged. She had two shafts and two  propellers.

U-64 was fitted with six  torpedo tubes (four fitted at the bow and two at the stern), 22 torpedoes, one  SK C/32 naval gun, 180 rounds, and a  SK C/30 as well as a  C/30 anti-aircraft gun. The boat had a complement of forty-eight.

Service history
U-64 went to sea on 6 April 1940. For eight days, she roamed the North Sea in search of Allied convoys heading to Norway in support of the campaign centred around that country. During that time she encountered no enemy vessels. Her deck was also riddled with machine-gun fire. The U-boat then sank to the bottom of the harbor, eight of her crew went down with her. The remaining 38 were able to escape the sinking vessel and were picked up by German mountain troops stationed ashore.

References

Bibliography

External links

German Type IX submarines
U-boats commissioned in 1939
U-boats sunk in 1940
World War II submarines of Germany
1939 ships
World War II shipwrecks in the Norwegian Sea
U-boats sunk by British aircraft
Ships built in Bremen (state)
Maritime incidents in April 1940